Katarina Ježić (born 19 December 1992) is a Croatian handball player for Vipers Kristiansand and the Croatian national team.

She participated at the 2011 World Women's Handball Championship in Brazil.

Achievements
Norwegian Cup:
Winner: 2022/23

Individual awards 
Handball-Planet.com World Best Young Female Line Player: 2013–14

References

External links

1992 births
Living people
Croatian female handball players
Handball players from Rijeka
Mediterranean Games bronze medalists for Croatia
Competitors at the 2013 Mediterranean Games
ŽRK Zamet players
Siófok KC players
Expatriate handball players
Croatian expatriate sportspeople in Hungary
Croatian expatriate sportspeople in Montenegro
Croatian expatriate sportspeople in Romania
Mediterranean Games medalists in handball
21st-century Croatian women